Motter is a surname. Notable people with the surname include:

Adilson E. Motter (born 1974), Brazilian scientist
Alex Motter (1913–1996), Canadian professional ice hockey player
Dean Motter, Canadian illustrator, designer and writer
Taylor Motter (born 1989), American professional baseball player

See also
 Jeni Mawter (born 1959), Australian children's author
 John C. Motter House, historic building in Frederick, Maryland
 William Motter Inge (1913–1973), American playwright and novelist